Niphad railway station is a railway station in the state of Maharashtra, India, on the Central Railway network, 32 km from . It is a small and not very busy station.

Important trains

Some of the important trains that pass through Niphad are:

 13201/02 Rajendranagar Express
 12139/40 Sewagram Express
 12117/18 Godavari Superfast Express

References

Railway stations in Nashik district